Codex 0318 (in the Gregory-Aland numbering), is the most recently registered New Testament Greek uncial codex. It is a diglot Greek–Coptic manuscript. It consists of 18 two-column, 27-line, 25 cm by 22 cm pages. The remaining text is from the Gospel of Mark, including most of chapters nine through 14. It is now part of the Morgan Library and Museum collection (M 661) in New York City.

Currently it is dated by the INTF to the 6th or 7th century.

See also 

 List of New Testament uncials
 Textual criticism

References

External links 
 "Continuation of the Manuscript List" Institute for New Testament Textual Research, University of Münster. Retrieved April 9, 2008

Greek New Testament uncials
6th-century biblical manuscripts
Collection of the Morgan Library & Museum